Krzysztof Lewandowski (born 20 January 2005) is an international speedway rider from Poland.

Speedway career 
Lewandowski came to prominence when he reached the final of the 2022 World U23 Championship finishing in 18th place and was selected for the Poland national under-21 speedway team for the 2023 season.

He rode in both the 2021 Speedway Grand Prix and the 2022 Speedway Grand Prix as a track reserve at the Rose Motoarena in Toruń. During 2021 and 2022 he has ridden for KS Toruń in the Ekstraliga.

References 

Living people
2005 births
Polish speedway riders